The New Zealand national women's cricket team toured England from 29 June to 20 July 2010 where they played the England women's cricket team in five One Day Internationals (ODIs) and three Twenty20s Internationals (T20Is). They also played against Ireland in one ODI.

T20I series

1st T20I

2nd T20I

3rd T20I

Only ODI: Ireland v New Zealand
The New Zealand national women's cricket team played Ireland in a One Day International (ODI) on 4 July 2010.

Tour match

ODI series

1st ODI

2nd ODI

3rd ODI

4th ODI

5th ODI

References

2010 in women's cricket
2010 in English women's cricket
Women's cricket tours of England
England 2010
2010 in New Zealand cricket
cricket